Jasper Evan Sadler III (9 November 1951 – 13 December 2018) was an American hematologist.

Sadler was born in Huntington, West Virginia, on 9 November 1951 to pathologist Jasper Evan Sadler Jr. and his wife Clara Rose Thompson Sadler. The younger Sadler studied chemistry at Princeton University and completed a medical degree at Duke University School of Medicine. Sadler completed his residency at Duke and a fellowship at  the University of Washington and subsequently joined Washington University in St. Louis faculty in 1984. Between 1982 and 2008, Sadler was a Howard Hughes Medical Investigator. In 2014, Sadler was appointed Ira M. Lang Professor of Medicine.

In 1988, Sadler was elected a member of the American Society for Clinical Investigation. He was granted fellowship by the American Association for the Advancement of Science in 1998, and membership by the National Academy of Medicine in 2013. Sadler was president of the American Society of Hematology and won the organization's Henry M. Stratton Medal for Basic Science in 2016, followed by its Exemplary Service Award in 2018. He received the Distinguished Career Award and Robert P. Grant Medal from the International Society on Thrombosis and Haemostasis in 2001 and 2018, respectively. Sadler died of Creutzfeldt-Jakob disease in Clayton, Missouri, on 13 December 2018, aged 67.

References

1951 births
2018 deaths
American hematologists
Duke University School of Medicine alumni
Princeton University alumni
Washington University in St. Louis faculty
Howard Hughes Medical Investigators
People from Huntington, West Virginia
Physicians from West Virginia
Fellows of the American Association for the Advancement of Science
Members of the National Academy of Medicine
Deaths from Creutzfeldt–Jakob disease
Neurological disease deaths in Missouri
Presidents of the American Society of Hematology